Steve Jacobs is an Australian actor and film director who is married to actress and producer Anna Maria Monticelli. The two co-starred in Sky Trackers. Jacobs directed the movie La Spagnola (2001), which was written and produced by Monticelli. In 2008 he directed John Malkovich in a film adaptation of J. M. Coetzee's novel Disgrace, again produced and adapted by Monticelli. It premiered at the Toronto International Film Festival, where it won the Prize of the International Critics.

Television credits 
Selected television credits include:
 A Country Practice
 The Dirtwater Dynasty
 Mission:Impossible
 G.P.
 R.F.D.S.
 Sky Trackers
 Blue Murder (mini-series)
 Police Rescue
 Halifax f.p.: episode Without Consent (1996)
 All Saints
 Medivac (TV series)
 Wildside (TV series)
 Stingers
 White Collar Blue
 East West 101
 All Together Now

References

External links 

1967 births
Living people
AACTA Award winners
American film directors